David Enoch is an ethicist and philosopher of law with research interests in moral, political and legal philosophy within the analytic tradition. He is the co-director of the Center for Moral and Political Philosophy and has been the Rodney Blackman Chair in the Philosophy of Law at the Hebrew University of Jerusalem since 2005. He received his Bachelor of Arts in philosophy and Bachelor of Laws degrees from Tel Aviv University in 1993. He then completed his PhD in philosophy at New York University in 2003.

His Book "Taking Morality Seriously: A Defense of Robust Realism" 

In his book "Taking Morality Seriously: A Defense of Robust Realism", Enoch puts forward a metaethical-realist account of morality, and of normativity in general. According to his view, moral norms and moral facts in particular, and normative ones in general are objective, in the sense that they are not dependent on social norms or beliefs, but only contingently. Likewise, moral norms/facts/propositions are all non-naturalistically reducible, meaning they cannot be fully specified without the use of moral language. For example, a naturalistic account of morality might be "greatest happiness to greatest numbers", which thus can be understood in empirical sense by happiness measurements; while a non-naturalistic account requires the existence of moral facts which are of all different nature of the empirical. Enoch further states that even those who believe otherwise are obliged to his robust realistic account, every time they deliberate. 
Enoch further explains that morality is accessible to us via critical thinking, and its truth value is derived from normative facts, which are external to the natural world. Thus, one may state a moral claim, and by doing so he/she will be saying something that may be true or false, and the truth value is entwined with the normative fact.

Books

References

External links 
 David Enoch's website
 

21st-century Israeli philosophers
Philosophers of law
Israeli ethicists
Academic staff of the Hebrew University of Jerusalem
Year of birth missing (living people)
Living people
Moral realists